The following lists events that happened during 1878 in New Zealand.

Incumbents

Regal and viceregal
Head of State – Queen Victoria
Governor – The Marquess of Normanby

Government and law
The 6th New Zealand Parliament continues.

Speaker of the House – Sir William Fitzherbet
Premier – Sir George Grey
Minister of Finance – William Larnach resigns on 5 March. He is succeeded by John Ballance on 12 July.
Chief Justice – Hon Sir James Prendergast

Main centre leaders
Mayor of Auckland – Henry Brett followed by Thomas Peacock
Mayor of Christchurch – James Gapes followed by Henry Thomson
Mayor of Dunedin – Richard Henry Leary followed by Henry John Walter
Mayor of Wellington – Joseph Dransfield

Events 
 2 February: Alois Lubecki makes the first telephone call in the country, between Dunedin and Milton. Later in the year the first public demonstration of the telephone is made with a call between Blenheim and Nelson.
 30 September: Great Flood of 1878 that killed at least three people and several bridges destroyed in Clutha and Southland by torrents caused by the rapid melting of heavy winter snows in Central Otago in Winter.
Undated
 Ashburton is made a borough.

Sport

Cricket
An Australian team tours New Zealand in January and February, playing seven provincial teams. None of the matches have first-class status as the home sides fielded between 15 and 22 players. A win by the Canterbury XV is the first ever win by a New Zealand side over an international touring team.

 See Australian cricket team in New Zealand in 1877–78

Horse racing
New Zealand Cup winner: Maritana
New Zealand Derby winner: Natator
Auckland Cup winner: Ariel
Wellington Cup winner: Lara

Rugby union
New clubs were formed in Featherston and Carterton, both in the south Wairarapa. Existing football clubs in Gisborne, Palmerston North and Feilding adopted rugby rules.

Shooting
Ballinger Belt: No competition

Births 
 10 September: Fanny Irvine-Smith, teacher and writer
 9 May: Jessie Buckland, photographer

Deaths
 9 February:  William Williams, first Bishop of Waiapu.
 11 February: William Barnard Rhodes, businessman and politician. 
 6 December: Sir John Richardson, politician.
 25 December Thomas Bartley, politician.

See also
List of years in New Zealand
Timeline of New Zealand history
History of New Zealand
Military history of New Zealand
Timeline of the New Zealand environment

References
General
 Romanos, J. (2001) New Zealand Sporting Records and Lists. Auckland: Hodder Moa Beckett. 
Specific

External links